Ansyari Lubis (born 29 July 1970 in Tebing Tinggi, Sumatera Utara) is an Indonesian footballer. He normally plays as an attacking midfielder. He is currently the assistant coach of PSS Sleman.

Club career 
His transfer fee from Medan Jaya to Pelita Jaya was over Rp 25.000.000.

International career 
He formerly played for the Indonesia national football team in the 1990s. He participated in international events with Senior National Team at the Pre Olympic, Kemerdekaan Cup and the Sea Games.

Lubis made 29 appearances for the Indonesia national football team from 1995 to 1997.

References 

Indonesian footballers
1970 births
Living people
People from Tebing Tinggi
Pelita Jaya FC players
Persib Bandung players
PSDS Deli Serdang players
Indonesia international footballers
Indonesian football managers
People of Batak descent
Association football midfielders
Sportspeople from North Sumatra